Russ & Daughters is an appetizing store opened in 1914. It is located at 179 East Houston Street, on the Lower East Side of Manhattan, New York City. A family-operated store, it has been at the same location since 1920.

History
Joel Russ, a Jewish immigrant from Poland who arrived in Manhattan around 1905, started the business to cater to the Jewish immigrants settling in the Lower East Side of New York. He began by carrying Polish mushrooms on his shoulders, and saved enough money to purchase a pushcart. He then expanded his operation and sold pickled herring as well as Polish mushrooms. Then in 1914, Russ opened J Russ International Appetizers, a storefront around the corner from the current location.

In 1920, Russ opened his store at the current location of 179 East Houston Street. In 1933, he renamed the business "Russ and Daughters" after making his three daughters, Hattie, Anne, and Ida, partners in the store. Historically, businesses typically took on the name "and sons", but since Russ and his wife Bella had only daughters, his business became Russ & Daughters. However, Russ was not a feminist ahead of his time. According to Hattie, she and the other daughters had all worked in the store "since they were 8 years old" on weekends, fishing out the herring fillets from the pickle barrels. Once each one of them finished high school, they all worked full-time. Moreover, Russ kept the store open seven days a week.

Calvin Trillin wrote about Russ & Daughters in the 1970s in his New Yorker food pieces.

In 2008 The Jews of New York documentary premiered on PBS, featuring three generations of the Russ & Daughters family (Anne Russ Federman and Hattie Russ Gold, the two surviving Russ daughters; Mark Russ Federman, then the proprietor; Niki Russ Federman; and Josh Russ Tupper.) The documentary tells, among other things, the story of Russ & Daughters from the early 1900s to the (then) present. The third daughter, Ida, had died.

Russ & Daughters: Reflections and Recipes from the House That Herring Built, by Mark Russ Federman (grandson of Joel Russ), with an introduction by Calvin Trillin, was published in 2013.

Russ & Daughters received the 2013 Jewish Cultural Achievement Award, making it the first restaurant to receive a Jewish Cultural Achievement Award.

In 2014, The Sturgeon Queens, a documentary about Russ & Daughters, premiered. It features, among others, Anne Russ Federman, 92 years old at the time, and Hattie Russ Gold, 100 years old at the time, who were the two surviving Russ daughters. The Sturgeon Queens was Joel Russ’ affectionate nickname for his daughters.

Josh Russ Tupper and Niki Russ Federman, cousins, now run Russ & Daughters, the 4th generation of Russes to do so.

In 2015 the New York state Senate honored Russ & Daughters with a resolution marking its 100th anniversary; the resolution had been drafted in June 2014 but was presented to the Russ & Daughters staff on January 7, 2015.

Additional locations
In May 2014, Tupper and Federman opened the restaurant Russ & Daughters Café on Orchard Street.

In late 2014, a restaurant cafe was announced for the Jewish Museum. The Russ & Daughters restaurant in the Jewish Museum opened in February 2016.

In popular culture
Josh Russ Tupper appeared on The Martha Stewart Show to make Chopped Liver, the Oy Vey Schmear sandwich, Whitefish & Baked Salmon Salad and the Super Heebster sandwich.

The Leonard Lopate Show on NPR discussed Russ & Daughters. WNYC featured Russ & Daughters when Amy Eddings reported on "Last Chance Foods", in a segment called "A Palatable Passover: Russ & Daughters explains matzo, gefilte fish and charoset."

Russ & Daughters was also featured on two episodes of the TV series Louie and in the theatrical movie Lola Versus.

Anthony Bourdain covered Russ & Daughters in the 'Disappearing Manhattan' episode of Anthony Bourdain: No Reservations (Season 5, Episode 6) with American journalist and novelist, Joel Rose.

In 2021, the Financial Times ranked it as one of the “50 greatest food stores in the world.”

See also
 List of Ashkenazi Jewish restaurants

References

Further reading
 "A fourth-generation business, Russ & Daughters is a reminder of the people that, historically, make this city what it is. You know them, you trust them, and they promise to do right by you." The New York Times Magazine

External links
 

1914 establishments in New York City
Appetizing stores
Ashkenazi Jewish restaurants
Food and drink companies of the United States
American companies established in 1914
Food and drink companies established in 1914
Retail companies established in 1914
Jewish delicatessens in the United States
Jews and Judaism in Manhattan
Kosher style restaurants
Lower East Side
Polish-Jewish culture in New York City